Tempestad is a 2016 Mexican documentary film directed by Tatiana Huezo. It was selected as the Mexican entry for the Best Foreign Language Film at the 90th Academy Awards, but it was not nominated.

Synopsis
Two women who have suffered the brutal consequences of human trafficking in Mexico tell their stories.

Reception
The film has a rating of 91% on Rotten Tomatoes.

Awards and nominations

See also
 List of submissions to the 90th Academy Awards for Best Foreign Language Film
 List of Mexican submissions for the Academy Award for Best Foreign Language Film

References

External links
 

2016 films
2016 documentary films
2010s Spanish-language films
Mexican documentary films
2010s Mexican films